Ellevest is a financial company built by women, for women. It was cofounded by Sallie Krawcheck and Charlie Kroll in 2014, with venture capital provided in part by Melinda Gates's Pivotal Ventures, Valerie Jarrett, and Eric Schmidt. As of 2022, it manages more than $1.5 billion with over 120,000 users, about 90% of whom identify as women. Ellevest provides digital investing tools and financial guidance, as well as private wealth management for individuals, families, and organizations. Its gender-aware investment algorithm takes into account that women often have longer lifespans than men, and thus may need to save or invest more money to account for a longer retirement period. The algorithm also factors in that women typically hit their salary peaks earlier in life than men and typically have lower salaries due to the gender pay gap. Ellevest also allows its users to financially plan for income breaks or decreases, which can be necessary due to having children or providing elder care.

Though it initially began as a long-term wealth management platform, it now includes workshops and financial planning. It has a subscription business model for its online investing business, with two different membership tiers.

References

Robo-advisors
Financial services companies established in 2014
Financial services companies based in New York City